is a song recorded by Japanese singer-songwriter Noriyuki Makihara. It was released as a single by Toshiba EMI on July 28, 2004. It is the theme song to the AX drama series Last Present: Musume to Ikiru Saigo no Natsu (ラストプレゼント 娘と生きる最後の夏), starring Yūki Amami. The song was later used in commercials for Systena. "Boku ga Ichiban Hoshikatta Mono" was first recorded as "The Gift" by Blue, a bonus track from their album Guilty. The song was later self-covered by Makihara and released as a single from the album Explorer (2004).

Chart performance
"Boku ga Ichiban Hoshikatta Mono" debuted at number 9 on the Oricon Singles Chart with 22,000 copies sold. It dropped to number 17 the following week, selling 11,000 copies. The single held onto the top twenty one last week at number 20, with 10,000 copies sold in its third charting week. "Boku ga Ichiban Hoshikatta Mono" charted for sixteen weeks on the Oricon Singles Chart, selling a reported total of 81,000 copies during its run.

Track listing

Charts

Certification

References

2004 songs
2004 singles
EMI Music Japan singles